Thout 22 - Coptic calendar - Thout 24

The twenty-third day of the Coptic month of Thout, the first month of the Coptic year. On a common year, this day corresponds to September 20, of the Julian Calendar, and October 3, of the Gregorian Calendar. This day falls in the Coptic season of Akhet, the season of inundation.

Commemorations

Saints 

 The martyrdom of Saint Thecla, the first female martyr 
 The martyrdom of Saint Eunapius and saint Andrew his brother

Other commemorations 

 The re-opening of the Church of the Virgin Mary in Haret El-Roum, 1312 (AD)

References 

Days of the Coptic calendar